Pe'at Sadeh (lit. Mouth Field) was an Israeli settlement, in the Gaza Strip until 2005.

History
Pe'at Sadeh was originally established in 1989 by a group of families on the 'Slav' Israel Defense Forces base in the southern end of Gush Katif and moved to its later site on an adjacent hill in 1993. It was one of the few 'mixed' settlements in  Gush Katif settlement bloc which was predominantly Orthodox. 

Its name is a reference to Pe'a (Hebrew: פאה), a form of Jewish charity in which the corner of a field, vineyard or orchard is left unharvested for the poor to come and take what they need. Sadeh is Hebrew for field.

Unilateral disengagement
The 20 families, including at least 117 people, of Pe'at Sadeh were forcibly evicted from their homes by the IDF and Israeli Police as part of the Israel's unilateral disengagement plan in August 2005. Their houses and other structures were destroyed and the area was abandoned.

Former Israeli settlements in the Gaza Strip
Populated places established in 1989
Villages depopulated during the Arab–Israeli conflict
1993 establishments in the Palestinian territories
2005 disestablishments in the Palestinian territories